Dorothea Charlotte of Brandenburg-Ansbach (28 November 1661 – 15 November 1705) was a German noblewomen, and by her marriage to Ernest Louis, Landgravine consort of Hesse-Darmstadt. The marriage took place on 1 December 1687.

Life 
Dorothea Charlotte was a daughter of the Albert II, Margrave of Brandenburg-Ansbach (1620–1667), from his second marriage to Sophia Margaret of Oettingen-Oettingen (1634–1664), daughter of Joachim Ernest of Oettingen-Oettingen.

On 1 December 1687 she married Ernest Louis, Landgrave of Hesse-Darmstadt. He was under the guardianship of his mother, Elisabeth Dorothea of Saxe-Gotha-Altenburg until 1688.

Dorothea Charlotte was a pietist and exerted some influence upon the affairs of state in favour of the pietists in the first years of her marriage.  In cooperation with Philipp Jakob Spener, whose patron she became, she promoted pietism at the court and the local University.  After her death, Ernest Louis turned against pietism.

She died in 1705 and was buried in the City Church in Darmstadt.

Issue 

Her children were:
 Dorothea Sophie (1689–1723)
 married in 1710 Count John Frederick of Hohenlohe-Öhringen (1683–1765)
 Louis VIII, Landgrave of Hesse-Darmstadt (1691–1768)
 married in 1717 Countess Charlotte of Hanau-Lichtenberg (1700–1726)
 Charles William (1693–1707)
 Francis Ernest (1695–1717)
 Friederike Charlotte
 married in 1720 Landgrave Maximilian of Hesse-Kassel (1689–1753)

Ancestry

References 
 Gustav A Benrath, Martin Brecht: Pietism and the Modern Era, vol 13, Oxford University Press, p. 191 ff
 Martin Brecht: The Romantic, p. 412
 Heinrich Zehfu: antiquity of the royal capital Darmstadt, p. 69 ff

1661 births
1705 deaths
House of Hesse-Darmstadt
Margravines of Brandenburg-Ansbach
Daughters of monarchs